Idea stolli, the common tree nymph, is a species of nymphalid butterfly in the Danainae subfamily. It is found in South East Asia. There are twelve Idea species, of which five occur in West Malaysia.

The wings are white with black dots and veins. The wingspan is about 150 mm.

The larvae feed on Aganosma cymosa and Aganosma corymbosa.

Subspecies
Listed alphabetically:
 I. s. alcine Fruhstorfer, 1910 (southern Borneo, Sarawak)
 I. s. bintanga van Eecke, 1915 (Riau, Lingga Island)
 I. s. hypata Fruhstorfer, 1910 (Sulu Island)
 I. s. logani (Moore, 1883) (Peninsular Malaya, Singapore, Sumatra, Batu Island)
 I. s. stolli (Moore, 1883) (Java)
 I. s. thalassica Fruhstorfer, 1910 (Natuna Island)
 I. s. virgo Fruhstorfer, 1903 (northern Borneo)

References

Idea (butterfly)
Butterflies of Singapore
Butterflies of Borneo
Butterflies of Java
Butterflies of Indochina
Butterflies described in 1883